The Journal of Mind and Behavior is a  peer-reviewed academic journal in psychology published by the University of Maine Department of Psychology on behalf of The Institute of Mind and Behavior.

The journal publishes theoretical articles and literature reviews on the philosophy of psychiatry, theories of consciousness, and treatises on the history of psychology, but not empirical work. In addition, the journal publishes critical notices and book reviews.

It is abstracted in PsycINFO/Psychological Abstracts, EMBASE/Excerpta Medica, EBSCO,  Sociological Abstracts, and The Philosopher's Index.

References

External links 
 

Clinical psychology journals
Philosophy of mind journals
English-language journals
Quarterly journals
Publications established in 1980